Sale'aula is a village on the central north coast of Savai'i island in Samoa and is the traditional center of the Gaga'emauga political district. Chief council meetings are held at Vaitu’utu’u malae in the village. The village has a population of 600. Sale'aula is one of two main pules in samoa, the other consisting of safotulafai. Sale'aula is one of the two highest villaes in the whole samoa. Hence why they're called a pule village.

Volcanic eruptions

Volcanic eruptions of Mt Matavanu (1905 - 1911) in central Savai'i swept northwards towards the coast and destroyed villages in its path.

The depth of the lava flow in some parts was 400 feet. A Catholic church and a meetinghouse of the LDS Church were also buried.

Sale'aula land was covered by lava that reached other villages to the east including Mauga and Samalae'ulu.

The colonial German administration acquired land on the main island Upolu and resettled villagers at Salamumu and Leauva'a. Today, those villagers are still part of the Gaga'emauga electoral district on Savai'i.

Today, a few families have re-built homes upon the lava fields where there is sparse volcanic vegetation. There are some church ruins and the grave of a nun which was encircled by the lava flow. Local families provide fale accommodation for visitors and tourists by the lava and the coast.

Origins
Samoa has different stories about the origins of different names and villages.

For the origin of Sale'aula village, one version tells of two brothers, Le'aula and Letufuga. Le'aula founded the village of Saleaula (Sa Le'aula, family of Le'aula), and Letufuga founded Safotulafai.

References

Populated places in Gaga'emauga